Sondra is the fourth and final studio album by Australian rock and pop band The Sports, released in May 1981. The album peaked at number 20 on the Australian Kent Music Report.

Reception

Steve Schnee from AllMusic questioned the decision to have Cameron Allan produce the album, believing his skills to be "muddy and lifeless at best," adding that "the production not only reined in the band's considerable talent, it stifled any energy and excitement that they may have had." Schnee said "Stephen Cummings still sounded confident, but ultimately seemed detached from the material, as if he was already going through the motions." Perhaps he was already planning his escape to a solo career, which came to fruition when the band split up shortly after this album was released.

Track listing

Personnel
The Sports
 Steve Cummings - vocals
 Martin Armiger - guitar, backing vocals
 Andrew Pendlebury - guitar, backing vocals
 Robert Glover - bass
 Freddie Strauks - drums

Charts

References

The Sports albums
Mushroom Records albums
1981 albums